Frederick Edwards (28 February 1908 – 27 April 1982) was an Australian cricketer. He played five first-class matches for South Australia in 1934/35.

See also
 List of South Australian representative cricketers

References

External links
 

1908 births
1982 deaths
Australian cricketers
South Australia cricketers
Cricketers from Sydney